Incendiary is a 2008 British drama film portraying the aftermath of a terrorist attack at a football match. It is directed by Sharon Maguire and stars Michelle Williams, Ewan McGregor, and Matthew Macfadyen.  It is about a suicide bombing at Emirates Stadium during an Arsenal F.C. match, and its aftermath in the life of a woman who loses her husband and young son in the attack. It is based on the 2005 novel Incendiary by Chris Cleave.

Plot
A young East Ender woman (Michelle Williams) is married to bomb-disposal officer Lenny (Nicholas Gleaves); they have a four-year-old son (Sidney Johnston).

While the young mother is having an affair with a reporter called Jasper (Ewan McGregor), Lenny, their son, and about 1000 others are killed in a terrorist attack carried out by six suicide bombers at a football match.  Both Jasper and Lenny's boss, Terrence Butcher (Matthew Macfadyen), who is in charge of the anti-terrorist division, try to comfort the mother. Both are also romantically interested in her.

Through Jasper's investigation into the bombing, the mother discovers the identity of one of the terrorists. She befriends his teenage son (Usman Khokhar), who only knows that his father is missing since the attacks. When he finds out what his father did, he panics and runs, causing the police to suspect him to be a terrorist. When he tries to take something out of his pocket they think he has a gun or wants to trigger a bomb; they shoot at him, but he is unarmed. The mother, who tried to protect him, is wounded, but not severely. Later, the terrorist's wife and son apologize to the mother for his part in the killings.

Terrence confesses to the mother that he knew that a suicide attack was going to happen and could have stopped it, but he did not in order to be able to continue his investigation of the terrorist group.  He says that he did not know in which stadium it would happen, and also thought it would be of a smaller scale. Although he knew Lenny and his son would be going, he did not warn them.

Sometimes the mother is confused, thinking that nothing has happened to her son. Throughout the film, for therapeutic reasons, she writes a letter addressed to Osama bin Laden, who is assumed to be responsible for the attack.

In the film's final scenes, the mother has another son by Jasper, who is seen running to the hospital and asking for her at the nursing station.

Cast 
 Michelle Williams – Young Mother
 Ewan McGregor – Jasper Black
 Matthew Macfadyen –  Terrence Butcher
 Nicholas Gleaves – Lenny
 Sidney Johnston – The Boy
 Usman Khokhar – The Bomber's Son
 Sasha Behar – Mrs. Ghorbani, the Bomber's Wife
 Ed Hughes – Danny Walsh (as Edward Hughes)
 Alibe Parsons – Pearl
 Stewart Wright – Charlie
 Al Hunter Ashton – Male Survivor
 Benjamin Wilkin – Young Policeman
 Steve Leatherbarrow - Policeman
 Robin Berry – Dazed Supporter
 Mercy Ojelade – Nurse Mena
 Joe Marshall – Gary / VT Man

Production

Filming began on 26 March 2007 in London, England. The first filmed scenes were shot on location in Northampton Square and the Brunswick Estate in Islington, North London. Filming also took place at Leyton Orient's Brisbane Road stadium. Filming continued during the week of 30 April 2007 in St Albans, in particular in and around the Cathedral, St Albans School, and Westminster Lodge.

The production also visited The Metropolitan Training College facilities near Gravesend to shoot the scenes at the football stadium, after the bomb has exploded.

Reception 
Generally, the film received poor reviews. Tom Charity, after viewing the film at the 2008 Sundance Film Festival, gave it one star out of five and called it an "ambitious/opportunistic effort that misses the mark, from the one-dimensional characters to the craven plotting and sentimental tone."

Philip French called it an "ambitious British picture on an urgent topical subject [that] is torpedoed by a poor script."

Time Out gave it two stars out of six, saying "there are so many things wrong with writer-director Sharon Maguire’s first film since Bridget Jones's Diary in 2001 that it's hard to know where to start, but the fatal problem is that this is a film with an identity crisis"; the film at times seems like a "study of guilt and grief" and at other times a "conspiracy thriller" but "ends up being a compendium of bizarre diversions, most of which are utterly surplus to the film’s half-cocked desire to stick with the experience and emotions of its main character."

References

External links 

Films about terrorism in Europe
2008 films
British drama films
2000s English-language films
Films based on British novels
2008 drama films
Films set in London
Films directed by Sharon Maguire
Films scored by Shigeru Umebayashi
2000s British films